Apanolio Creek is a  southward-flowing stream in San Mateo County, California, United States which is a tributary of Pilarcitos Creek.

References

See also
List of watercourses in the San Francisco Bay Area

Rivers of San Mateo County, California
Rivers of Northern California